Lucy Hastings, Countess of Huntingdon (1613 – 14 November 1679), born Lucy Davies, was a seventeenth-century English poet.

Biography
She was the daughter of Sir John Davies (1569–1626) of Englefield, Berkshire, a prominent courtier in the reigns of James I and Charles I and himself a poet; her mother was notorious as the "mad prophetess" Dame Eleanor Davies (1590–1652), sister of the executed Lord Castlehaven. At the young age of ten years, her father arranged a marriage for her with Ferdinando Hastings, son and heir of Henry Hastings, 5th Earl of Huntingdon (1586–1643). (The Earl was aristocratic but poor; Davies was wealthy and ambitious, and had earlier purchased one of the Earl's estates.) Now Lucy Hastings, she was tutored by Bathsua Makin and became fluent in French, Spanish, Latin, Greek, and Hebrew; she translated the Latin poems of Peter du Moulin.

As Countess of Huntingdon, Lucy Hastings became involved in a bitter property dispute with her mother in the years 1627–33; Eleanor Davies denounced her daughter as a "Jezebel," though troubles due to her religious writings caused the older woman to be imprisoned and lose control of her property to her daughter for a decade.

Though her husband, then the 6th Earl of Huntingdon, was outwardly neutral during the English Civil War, other members of the family, including his brother Henry Hastings, were ardent Royalists. The Hastings family estate, Ashby de la Zouch Castle, was taken by Parliamentary forces in March 1646; the surrender terms demanded that the Castle be demolished, and the family moved to their estate at Donington Park.

Lucy Hastings bore her husband four sons, though three predeceased their father; when the family's heir (another Henry Hastings) died of smallpox in June 1649, his passing inspired a collection of elegies titled Lachrymae Musarum ("Tears of the Muses"), edited by Richard Brome and containing verses by John Dryden, Andrew Marvell, Robert Herrick, and others. When the sixth Earl died on 13 February 1656, he was succeeded by Theophilus Hastings, the couple's fourth and sole surviving son.

Lucy Hastings' poems were not published in her lifetime, as was usually the case for women who wrote in this historical era. Her work has gained more critical attention in the general rediscovery of women writers of previous centuries in the contemporary era.

References
Cope, Esther S. Handmaid of the Holy Spirit: Dame Eleanor Davies, Never Soe Mad a Ladie. Ann Arbor, MI, University of Michigan Press, 1992
Davidson, Peter, and Jane Stevenson, eds. Early Modern Women Poets: An Anthology. Oxford, oxford University Press, 2001.

1613 births
1679 deaths
17th-century English nobility
17th-century English poets
English women poets
Lucy Hastings
Latin–English translators
People from Englefield, Berkshire
17th-century English women writers
Huntingdon
17th-century English translators
Women in the English Civil War